The International Center of Photography (ICP), at 79 Essex Street on the Lower East Side of Manhattan, New York City, consists of a museum for photography and visual culture and a school offering an array of educational courses and programming. ICP's photographic collection, reading room, and archives are at Mana Contemporary in Jersey City, New Jersey. The organization was founded by Cornell Capa in 1974.

ICP is the host of the Infinity Awards, inaugurated in 1985 "to bring public attention to outstanding achievements in photography by honoring individuals with distinguished careers in the field and by identifying future luminaries."

History 
Since its founding in 1974 by Cornell Capa with help from Micha Bar-Am in Willard Straight House, on Fifth Avenue's Museum Mile, ICP has presented over 500 exhibitions, bringing the work of more than 3,000 photographers and other artists to the public in one-person and group exhibitions and provided various classes and workshops for students. ICP was founded to keep the legacy of "Concerned Photography" alive. After the untimely deaths of his brother Robert Capa and his colleagues Werner Bischof, Chim (David Seymour), and Dan Weiner in the 1950s, Capa saw the need to keep their humanitarian documentary work in the public eye. In 1966 he founded the International Fund for Concerned Photography. By 1974 the Fund needed a home, and the International Center of Photography was created.

In 1985, a satellite facility, ICP Midtown, was created. Plans were also made for the redesign and reconstruction of the Midtown location.

Redesign and reconstruction 

In 1999, the headquarters building at 1130 Fifth Avenue was sold. The expanded galleries at 1133 Avenue of the Americas at 43rd Street were designed by Gwathmey Siegel & Associates Architects for the display of photography and new media. The reopening in the fall of 2000 of the  site, previously used as a photo gallery for Kodak, provided in one location the same amount of gallery space as the two previous sites combined and became the headquarters of ICP's public exhibitions programs, and also housed an expanded store and a café.

The expansion of the school of the International Center of Photography in the fall of 2001 created a Midtown campus diagonally across from the museum in the Grace Building at 1114 Avenue of the Americas. Designed by the architecture firm Gensler, the  school facility doubled ICP's teaching space and allowed ICP to expand both its programming and community outreach.

Move to the Bowery and Essex Crossing 
In 2014, ICP's board approved a plan to buy a building on the Bowery near the New Museum and relocate there. The center's school, whose lease continued through 2018, remained in Midtown, but was expected to eventually move downtown to consolidate operations. The midtown museum closed on January 11, 2015, when its lease ended. The ICP museum at 250 Bowery opened on June 23, 2016. In 2017, ICP signed a deal with Delancey Street Associates to house its museum and school at Essex Crossing on the Lower East Side. In 2019, ICP sold its space at 250 Bowery and purchased its new home at 79 Essex Street at Essex Crossing.

In January 2020, ICP opened its new integrated center at 79 Essex Street. Designed by architecture firm Gensler, the  building has galleries, media labs, classrooms, darkrooms, shooting studios, a shop, café, research library and public event spaces. The new space is the cultural anchor of the $1.9 billion six-acre Essex Crossing development.

ICP School

ICP's school serves more than 3,500 students each year, offering courses in a curriculum that ranges from darkroom classes to certificate and master's degree programs. Other educational programming includes a lecture series, seminars, symposia, and workshops hosted by professional photographers.

Opened in 2001, the School was previously at a  facility at 1114 Avenue of the Americas. Designed by Gensler, it was across the street from the former ICP Museum. ICP's school and museum are now located in a unified center on Manhattan's Lower East Side at 79 Essex Street.

The school offers a year-round selection of continuing education classes; three one-year Certificate programs (Creative Practices in Photography, Documentary Practice and Visual Journalism, and New Media Narratives); and the ICP-Bard Program in Advanced Photographic Studies, a two-year graduate program leading to a master of fine arts degree.

Public programs
Public programs address issues in photography and its relationship to art, culture, and society and promote the interpretation of ICP's exhibitions and collections. The Photographers Lecture Series invites photographers to present their work while sharing ideas and concerns about the medium. Other seminars, symposia, and panel discussions feature artists, critics, scholars, and historians.

Community programs
Community programs relate to the exhibitions. Programs include interactive tours, family day events, workshops, long-term photography programs in four New York City public schools, summer photography programs in community centers, and a high school internship program designed to promote youth leadership.

Infinity Awards 
The ICP hosts the Infinity Awards, which were inaugurated in 1985 "to bring public attention to outstanding achievements in photography by honoring individuals with distinguished careers in the field and by identifying future luminaries".

Winners
1985
 Master of Photography: André Kertész
 Applied/Fashion/Advertising: Sarah Moon
 Art: David Hockney
 Photojournalism: Alberto Venzago
 Publication: Photo Poche
 Young Photographer: 

1986
 Master of Photography: Hiroshi Hamaya
 Lifetime Achievement: Edward K. Thompson
 Art: Lucas Samaras
 Design: Alan Richardson
 Photojournalism: Sebastião Salgado
 Publication: W. Eugene Smith, Let Truth Be the Prejudice: W. Eugene Smith, His Life and Photographs
 Young Photographer: Anthony Suau

1987
 Master of Photography: Manuel Álvarez Bravo
 Lifetime Achievement: Harold Edgerton
 Applied/Fashion/Advertising: Jay Maisel
 Art: Robert Rauschenberg
 Design: Hans-Georg Pospischil
 Photojournalism: Eugene Richards
 Publication: Robert Frank, New York to Nova Scotia
 Young Photographer: Paul Graham

1988
 Master of Photography: Alfred Eisenstaedt
 Lifetime Achievement: Edwin H. Land
 Applied/Fashion/Advertising: Guy Bourdin
 Art: Georges Rousse and Joel-Peter Witkin
 Design: Werner Jeker
 Photojournalism: Sebastião Salgado
 Publication: Richard Misrach, Desert Cantos
 Writing: Peter Galassi
 Young Photographer: Marc Trivier

1989
 Master of Photography: Berenice Abbott
 Lifetime Achievement: Alexander Liberman
 Applied/Fashion/Advertising: Joyce Tenneson
 Art: Arnulf Rainer
 Design: Michael Rand
 Photojournalism: James Nachtwey
 Publication: Josef Koudelka, Exiles
 Writing: John Szarkowski
 Young Photographer: Pablo Cabado

1990
 Master of Photography: Yousuf Karsh
 Lifetime Achievement: Gordon Parks
 Applied/Fashion/Advertising: Annie Leibovitz
 Art: Chuck Close
 Photojournalism: Jacques Langevin
 Publication: Sarah Greenough and Joel Snyder, On the Art of Fixing a Shadow: One Hundred and Fifty Years of Photography
 Writing: Max Kozloff
 Young Photographer: Miro Svolik

1991
 Master of Photography: Harry Callahan
 Lifetime Achievement: Andreas Feininger
 Applied/Fashion/Advertising: Herb Ritts
 Art: Duane Michals
 Design: Gran Fury
 Photojournalism: Antonin Kratochvil
 Publication: Sylvia Plachy, Sylvia Plachy's Unguided Tour
 Writing: Anna Fárová
 Young Photographer: Walter Dhladhla

1992
 Master of Photography: Lennart Nilsson
 Lifetime Achievement: Carl Mydans
 Applied/Fashion/Advertising: Oliviero Toscani
 Art: Doug and Mike Starn
 Design: Gunter Rambow
 Photojournalism: Christopher Morris
 Publication: Irving Penn, Passage: A Work Record
 Writing: Alan Trachtenberg
 Young Photographer: Klaus Reisinger

1993
 Master of Photography: Richard Avedon
 Lifetime Achievement: Stefan Lorant
 Applied/Fashion/Advertising: Geof Kern
 Art: Anselm Kiefer
 Design: David Carson
 Photojournalism: James Nachtwey
 Publication: Jane Livingston, The New York School: Photographs, 1936-1963
 Writing: Arthur C. Danto
 Young Photographer: Nick Waplington

1994
 Master of Photography: Henri Cartier-Bresson
 Lifetime Achievement: Howard Chapnick
 Applied/Fashion/Advertising: Bruce Weber
 Art: Cindy Sherman
 Photojournalism: Hans-Jürgen Burkard
 Publication: Sebastião Salgado and Lelia Wanick Salgado, Workers: An Archaeology of the Industrial Age
 Writing: Maria Morris Hambourg and Pierre Apraxine
 Young Photographer: Fazal Sheikh

1995
 Master of Photography: Eve Arnold
 Lifetime Achievement: John Szarkowski
 Applied/Fashion/Advertising: Josef Astor
 Art: Clarissa Sligh
 Design: Yolanda Cuomo
 Photojournalism: Gilles Peress
 Publication: Eugene Richards, Americans We: Photographs and Notes
 Writing: Deborah Willis
 Young Photographer: Sean Doyle

1996
 Master of Photography: Horst P. Horst
 Lifetime Achievement: Cornell Capa
 Applied/Fashion/Advertising: Wolfgang Volz
 Art: Annette Messager
 Design: Markus Rasp
 Photojournalism: Lise Sarfati
 Publication: Gilles Peress, The Silence
 Writing: A. D. Coleman
 Young Photographer: Eva Leitolf

1997
 Master of Photography: Helen Levitt
 Lifetime Achievement: Robert Delpire
 Applied/Fashion/Advertising: David LaChapelle
 Art: Christian Boltanski
 Design: Chip Kidd
 Photojournalism: Mary Ellen Mark
 Publication: Chris Riley and Douglas Niven, The Killing Fields
 Writing: Vicki Goldberg
 Young Photographer: Lauren Greenfield

1998
 Master of Photography: Roy DeCarava
 Lifetime Achievement: Naomi Rosenblum and Walter Rosenblum
 Applied/Fashion/Advertising: Inez van Lamsweerde and Vinoodh Matadin
 Art: Sigmar Polke
 Design: J. Abbott Miller
 Photojournalism: Steve Hart
 Publication: Horst Faas and Tim Page, Requiem: By the Photographers Who Died in Vietnam and Indochina
 Writing: Robert Coles
 Young Photographer: Michael Ackerman

1999
 Master of Photography: Arnold Newman
 Lifetime Achievement: Harold Evans
 Applied/Fashion/Advertising: Julius Shulman
 Art: Hiroshi Sugimoto
 Design: Bart Houtman and Guido van Lier
 Photojournalism: Alexandra Boulat
 Publication: Charles Bowden, Juárez: The Laboratory of Our Future
 Writing: John Morris
 Young Photographer: Nicolai Fuglsig
 Special Presentation: L. Fritz Gruber

2000
 Cornell Capa Award: Robert Frank
 Lifetime Achievement: Nathan Lyons
 Applied/Fashion/Advertising: Hubble Heritage Project
 Art: Adam Fuss
 Photojournalism: James Nachtwey
 Publication: Manfred Heiting, Helmut Newton Work
 Writing: Andy Grundberg
 Young Photographer: Zach Gold

2001
 Cornell Capa Award: Mary Ellen Mark
 Lifetime Achievement: Roger Thérond
 Applied/Fashion/Advertising: Philip-Lorca diCorcia
 Art: Andreas Gursky
 Photojournalism: Luc Delahaye
 Publication: Jeff L. Rosenheim and Douglas Eklund, Unclassified: A Walker Evans Anthology
 Writing: Eugenia Parry
 Young Photographer: Elinor Carucci

2002
 Cornell Capa Award: here is New York: a democracy of photographs
 Lifetime Achievement: Michael E. Hoffman
 Applied/Fashion/Advertising: RJ Muna
 Art: Shirin Neshat
 Photojournalism: Tyler Hicks
 Publication: Robert Lebeck and Bodo von Dewitz, Kiosk: A History of Photojournalism
 Writing: Ariella Azoulay
 Young Photographer: Lynsey Addario
 Special Presentation: The New York Times "Portraits of Grief"

2003
 Cornell Capa Award: Marc Riboud
 Lifetime Achievement: Bernd and Hilla Becher
 Applied/Fashion/Advertising: Thái Công
 Art: Zarina Bhimji
 Photojournalism: Alex Majoli
 Publication: Deirdre O'Callaghan, Hide That Can
 Writing: Sara Stevenson
 Young Photographer: Jonas Bendiksen

2004
 Cornell Capa Award: Josef Koudelka
 Lifetime Achievement: William Eggleston
 Applied/Fashion/Advertising: Alison Jackson
 Art: Fiona Tan
 Photojournalism: Simon Norfolk
 Publication: Doon Arbus and Elisabeth Sussman, Diane Arbus: Revelations
 Writing: Susan Sontag
 Young Photographer: Tomoko Sawada

2005
 Cornell Capa Award: Susan Meiselas
 Lifetime Achievement: Bruce Weber
 Applied/Fashion/Advertising: Deborah Turbeville
 Art: Loretta Lux
 Photojournalism: The New Yorker
 Publication: Henryk Ross, Łódź Ghetto Album
 Writing: Vince Aletti
 Young Photographer: Tomás Munita

2006
 Cornell Capa Award: Don McCullin
 Lifetime Achievement: Lee Friedlander
 Applied/Fashion/Advertising: Steven Meisel
 Art: Thomas Ruff
 Trustee Award: Getty Images
 Photojournalism: Yuri Kozyrev
 Writing: Geoff Dyer
 Young Photographer: Ahmet Polat

2007
 Cornell Capa Award: Milton Rogovin
 Lifetime Achievement: William Klein
 Art: Tracey Moffatt
 Trustee Award: Karl Lagerfeld
 Publication: Tendance Floue, Sommes-Nous?
 Writing: David Levi Strauss
 Young Photographer: Ryan McGinley

2008
 Lifetime Achievement: Malick Sidibé
 Applied/Fashion/Advertising: Craig McDean
 Art: Edward Burtynsky
 Trustee Award: Diane Keaton
 Photojournalism: Anthony Suau
 Publication: Taryn Simon, An American Index of the Hidden and Unfamiliar
 Writing: Bill Jay
 Young Photographer: Mikhael Subotzky

2009
 Cornell Capa Award: Letizia Battaglia
 Lifetime Achievement: Annie Leibovitz
 Applied/Fashion/Advertising: Tim Walker
 Art: Rinko Kawauchi
 Trustee Award: Gayle G. Greenhill
 Photojournalism: Geert van Kesteren
 Publication: Aglaia Konrad, Desert Cities
 Writing: Aveek Sen
 Young Photographer: Lieko Shiga

2010
 Cornell Capa Award: Peter Magubane
 Lifetime Achievement: John G. Morris
 Applied/Fashion/Advertising: Daniele Tamagni
 Art: Lorna Simpson
 Trustee Award: Gilbert C. Maurer
 Photojournalism: Reza
 Publication: Sarah Greenough, Looking In: Robert Frank's "The Americans"
 Writing: Lucy Sante
 Young Photographer: 

2011
 Cornell Capa Award: Ruth Gruber
 Lifetime Achievement: Elliott Erwitt
 Applied/Fashion/Advertising: Viviane Sassen
 Art: Abelardo Morell
 Trustee Award: The Durst Family
 Photojournalism: Adrees Latif
 Publication: Alec Soth
 Writing: Gerry Badger
 Young Photographer: Peter van Agtmael

2012
 Cornell Capa Award: Ai Weiwei
 Lifetime Achievement: Daido Moriyama
 Applied/Fashion/Advertising: Maurice Scheltens and Liesbeth Abbenes
 Art: Stan Douglas
 Trustee Award: John "Launny" Steffens
 Photojournalism: Benjamin Lowy
 Publication: Museo Nacional Centro de Arte Reina Sofía, The Worker Photography Movement [1926–1939]
 Writing: David Campany
 Young Photographer: Anouk Kruithof

2013
 Cornell Capa Lifetime Achievement: David Goldblatt
 Applied/Fashion/Advertising: Erik Madigan Heck
 Art: Mishka Henner
 Trustee Award: Pat Schoenfeld
 Photojournalism: David Guttenfelder
 Publication: Cristina de Middel, The Afronauts
 Young Photographer: Kitra Cahana
 Special Presentation: Jeff Bridges

2014
 Cornell Capa Lifetime Achievement: Jürgen Schadeberg
 Applied/Fashion/Advertising: Steven Klein
 Art: James Welling
 Photojournalism: Stephanie Sinclair and Jessica Dimmock
 Publication: Adam Broomberg and Oliver Chanarin, Holy Bible
 Young Photographer: Samuel James

2015
 Cornell Capa Lifetime Achievement: Graciela Iturbide
 Art: Larry Fink
 Trustee Award: The Lean In Collection by Getty Images
 Photojournalism: Tomas van Houtryve
 Publication: LaToya Ruby Frazier, The Notion of Family
 New Media: Question Bridge: Black Males
 Young Photographer: Evgenia Arbugaeva
 Special Presentation: Mario Testino

2016
 Lifetime Achievement: David Bailey
 Art: Walid Raad
 Trustee Award: Artur Walther, The Walther Collection
 Documentary and Photojournalism: Zanele Muholi
 Artist's Book: Matthew Connors, Fire in Cairo
 Critical Writing and Research: Susan Schuppli
 Online Platform and New Media: Jonathan Harris and Gregor Hochmuth for Network Effect

2017
 Lifetime Achievement: Harry Benson
 Art: Sophie Calle
 Documentary and Photojournalism: Edmund Clark and Crofton Black, Negative Publicity
 Artist's Book: Michael Christopher Brown, Libyan Sugar
 Critical Writing and Research: Michael Famighetti and Sarah Lewis for "Vision & Justice," Aperture (no. 223, summer 2016)
 Online Platform and New Media: For Freedoms
 Emerging Photographer: Vasantha Yogananthan

2018
 Lifetime Achievement: Bruce Davidson
 Applied: Alexandra Bell
 Art: Samuel Fosso
 Artist's Book: Dayanita Singh, Museum Bhavan
 Critical Writing and Research: Maurice Berger, Race Stories column for the Lens section of the New York Times
 Documentary and Photojournalism: Amber Bracken
 Emerging Photographer: Natalie Keyssar
 Online Platform and New Media: Women Photograph
 Special Presentation: Juergen Teller
 Trustees Award: Thomson Reuters

2019

 Lifetime Achievement: Rosalind Fox Solomon
 Art: Dawoud Bey
 Critical Writing and Research: Zadie Smith, “Deana Lawson’s Kingdom of Restored Glory” for The New Yorker
 Emerging Photographer: Jess T. Dugan
 Special Presentation: Shahidul Alam
2022

Lifetime Achievement: Sebastião Salgado
Trustees: Gabriela Hearst
 Art: Sky Hopinka
 Documentary Practice & Photojournalism: Acacia Johnson
 Emerging Photographer: Esther Horvath

Permanent collection

The permanent collection at ICP contains more than 200,000 photographs and related materials from the earliest forms of photography to contemporary work. Since its opening in 1974, ICP has acquired important historical and contemporary images through an acquisitions committee and through donations and bequests from photographers and collectors. The collection spans the history of photography, including daguerrotypes, gelatin silver and digital chromogenic prints.

The collection is strongest in its holdings of American and European documentary photography of the 1930s to the 1990s. It comprises large bodies of work by W. Eugene Smith, Henri Cartier-Bresson, Robert Capa, the Farm Security Administration photographers, Alfred Eisenstaedt, Lisette Model, Gordon Parks, James VanDerZee, Louise Ozell Martin, and Garry Winogrand. Recent purchases have included work by contemporary photographers such as Carrie Mae Weems, Justine Kurland, Katy Grannan, Vik Muniz, and Susan Meiselas.

Another component of the collection is a significant group of photographically illustrated magazines, particularly those published between World War I and II, such as Vu, Regards, Picture Post, Lilliput, Berliner Illustrirte Zeitung, Arbeiter-Illustrierte-Zeitung, and Life.

Opened in 2015, the International Center of Photography at Mana Contemporary is a 15,000-square-foot space that houses the permanent collection, a media lab, areas for research, and a gallery.

Publications

In 2003 the ICP joined with the publisher Steidl of Göttingen, Germany to launch the photography imprint ICP/Steidl.

ICP/Steidl publications
"Strangers: The First ICP Triennial of Photography and Video." 2003. 
 Young America: The Daguerreotypes of Southworth and Hawes. 2005. Edited by Grant Romer and Brian Wallis. . Received New England Historical Society's Best Book of the Year and Kraszna-Krausz Book Award's Honorable Mention.
"Ecotopia: The Second ICP Triennial of Photography and Video." 2006
 Atta Kim: On Air. 2006. By Atta Kim. Received the Deutsche Börse Prize: Best Photo Book of the Year.
 Unknown Weegee. 2006. By Weegee. Received College Art Association Best Book Design, Honorable Mention.
 Snap Judgments: New Positions in Contemporary African Photography. 2006. Edited by Okwui Enwezor. Received the PHotoEspaña: Best International Photography Book of the Year.
 Susan Meiselas: In History. 2008. Received the Rencontres d’Arles 2009 Historical Book Award.
 The Mexican Suitcase: The Rediscovered Spanish Civil War Negatives of Capa, Chim, and Taro. 2010. Received the AAM's Frances Smyth-Ravenel Prize for Excellence in Publication Design and the German Photobook 2011 Prize's Gold Award.

Other ICP publications
 Reflections in a Glass Eye. ICP/Little, Brown, 1999. Edited by Ellen Handy.
 "A Different Kind of Order: The ICP Triennial"  New York: ICP/Delmonico Books Prestel, 2013.
 Roman Vishniac Rediscovered. New York: ICP/Delmonico Books Prestel, 2015. Edited by Maya Benton.

DVD
 The Decisive Moment (2007) by Henri Cartier-Bresson.

The ICP Library
The Library of the International Center of Photography serves more than 6,000 visitors a year. The information and bibliographic resources it provides are used by ICP staff, patrons, and researchers. As of 2008, the Library receives 75 periodicals and serials, and its collection of approximately 20,000 volumes and 2,000 files is available for on-site perusal.

Library materials are searchable on ICP's online catalog.

The GEH–ICP Alliance
In 2000, George Eastman House (GEH) and ICP launched the GEH–ICP Alliance, whose fundamental aim is to enhance public understanding and appreciation of photography, through exhibitions, publications, research, scholarship, collection sharing, and the joint website Photomuse.org.

In this collaboration, the staffs of the International Center of Photography and George Eastman House share resources, pool their expertise, and dovetail their collections for a series of exhibitions called "New Histories of Photography".

See also
 List of museums and cultural institutions in New York City

References

External links

 
 Infinity Awards
 Infinity Awards 2014 The Eye of Photography 27/02/14 (l'Oeil de la Photographie)

1974 establishments in New York City
Art museums established in 1974
Art museums and galleries in New York City
Art schools in New York City
Lower East Side
Museums in Manhattan
Photography museums and galleries in the United States
Private universities and colleges in New York City